God and Science: Return of the Ti-Girls is a graphic novel by American cartoonist Jaime Hernandez, published in 2012 after serialization in Love and Rockets: New Stories  in 2008–2009.

The story is the longest superhero tale Henrandez has produced; it features characters from comic books that the character Maggie Chascarillo had collected in Hernandez's Locas stories, but which had not until this story appeared on their own.

Publication

The story first appeared in the comic book Love and Rockets: New Stories  in 2008–2009, published by Fantagraphics Books.  A stand-alone book edition appeared from the same publisher in 2012, to which Hernandez added thirty pages and a new ending.

References

Works cited

Further reading

 

2012 graphic novels
American graphic novels
Jaime Hernandez
Fantagraphics titles